Brudzewo may refer to the following places:
Brudzewo, Greater Poland Voivodeship (west-central Poland)
Brudzewo, Lubusz Voivodeship (west Poland)
Brudzewo, Pomeranian Voivodeship (north Poland)